Kubáňovo is a village and municipality in the Levice District in the Nitra Region of Slovakia.

History
In historical records the village was first mentioned in 1236.

Geography
The village lies at an altitude of 127 metres and covers an area of 12.056 km2. It has a population of about 300 people.

Ethnicity
The village is approximately 79% Magyar, 21% Slovak.

Facilities
The village has a public library.

External links
https://web.archive.org/web/20070427022352/http://www.statistics.sk/mosmis/eng/run.html 

Villages and municipalities in Levice District